Variety Girl is a 1947 American musical comedy film directed by George Marshall and starring Mary Hatcher, Olga San Juan, DeForest Kelley, Frank Ferguson, Glenn Tryon, Nella Walker, Torben Meyer, Jack Norton, and William Demarest. It was produced by Paramount Pictures. Numerous Paramount contract players and directors make cameos or perform songs, with particularly large amounts of screen time featuring Bing Crosby and Bob Hope. Among many others, the studio contract players include Gary Cooper, Alan Ladd, Paulette Goddard, Ray Milland, William Holden, Burt Lancaster, Robert Preston, Veronica Lake, William Bendix, Barbara Stanwyck and Paula Raymond.

Overview
The opening caption reads, "This picture is dedicated to Variety Clubs, International, "The Heart of Show Business", which beats constantly in behalf of the under-privileged children of the world ... regardless of race, creed or color". The story revolves around two young girls who exchange identities, causing confusion at the Variety Club (show-business charity) and the Paramount studio.

The elaborate closing song, "Harmony," begins with Bing Crosby and Bob Hope singing and dancing on stage in matching checkered suits and straw hats, eventually moves to a merry-go-round with Gary Cooper in cowboy regalia seated on a plastic horse while talking through a couple of stanzas with Barry Fitzgerald, then gradually incorporates the entire cast, which includes almost everyone under contract to Paramount at the time, in a rousing finale launched by William Holden and Ray Milland chasing a scantily-clad woman across a soundstage.

The film includes a five-minute color Puppetoon segment Romeow and Julicat by George Pal in Technicolor which is in black and white in most prints.

Cast
Mary Hatcher as Catherine Brown
Olga San Juan as Amber La Vonne
DeForest Kelley as Bob Kirby
Frank Ferguson as R.J. O'Connell
Glenn Tryon as Bill Farris
Nella Walker as Mrs. Webster
Torben Meyer as Andre
Jack Norton as Busboy at Brown Derby
William Demarest as Barker
Frank Faylen as Stage manager

Celebrity appearances

Bing Crosby
Bob Hope
Gary Cooper
Ray Milland
Alan Ladd
Barbara Stanwyck
Paulette Goddard
Dorothy Lamour
Sonny Tufts
Joan Caulfield
William Holden
Lizabeth Scott
Burt Lancaster
Gail Russell
Diana Lynn
Sterling Hayden
Robert Preston
Veronica Lake
Pearl Bailey
John Lund
William Bendix
George Pal
Barry Fitzgerald
Howard Da Silva
Macdonald Carey
Cass Daley
Spike Jones & His City Slickers
Patric Knowles
Mona Freeman
Cecil Kellaway
Virginia Field
Richard Webb
Frank Faylen
Cecil B. DeMille
Mitchell Leisen
George Marshall
Paula Raymond
George Reeves
Wanda Hendrix
Stanley Clements
Walter Abel
Pinto Colvig

Reception
Variety wrote that the film "emerges a socko entertainment . . . [Hope] and Crosby click with their "Harmony" routine, a socko number for all its paraphrasing of the "Friendship" routine out of Du Barry Was a Lady which Bert Lahr and Ethel Merman made famous. The New York Times review of October 16, 1947 concluded: "The people who carry along the story are not to be overlooked for they bring to the effort the right spirit of good-natured abandon. Mary Hatcher, who was discovered in Oklahoma!, is a very welcome addition to the screen's songbird assembly, and she has a wide-eyed innocent look which won't hurt her either. Variety Girl is hodge-podge, to be sure. But let's not quibble about its lack of form, because it is a hearty slam-bang entertainment wherein the good very definitely outweighs the poor." Mae Tinée of the Chicago Daily Tribune wrote, "It would be difficult to select any one of this amiable aggregation for special honors."

Soundtrack
"Tallahassee" (Frank Loesser): sung by Alan Ladd, Dorothy Lamour and others
"Harmony" (Jimmy Van Heusen / Johnny Burke): sung by Bing Crosby, Bob Hope and others
"Tired" (Allan Roberts / Doris Fisher): sung by Pearl Bailey
"He Can Waltz" (Frank Loesser): sung by Mary Hatcher
"Your Heart Calling Mine" (Frank Loesser): sung by Mary Hatcher and Spike Jones and his City Slickers 
"Romeow and Julicat" (Edward H. Plumb): performed by Mary Hatcher, Pinto Colvig, and chorus
"I Must Have Been Madly in Love" (Frank Loesser)
"I Want My Money Back" (Frank Loesser)
"Impossible Things" (Frank Loesser)
"The French" (Frank Loesser)

The song "Tallahassee" appeared in the Billboard charts with recordings by Bing Crosby and The Andrew Sisters (#10 position) and by Dinah Shore and Woody Herman (#15 spot).

References

External links

1947 films
1947 musical comedy films
American musical comedy films
American black-and-white films
Films directed by George Marshall
Films shot in Los Angeles
Paramount Pictures films
Films with screenplays by Frank Tashlin
1940s English-language films
1940s American films